The medium ground finch (Geospiza fortis) is a species of bird in the family Thraupidae. It is endemic to the Galapagos Islands. Its primary natural habitat is tropical shrubland. One of Darwin's finches, the species was the first which scientists have observed evolving in real-time.

The population of medium ground finches has been experiencing inbreeding depression due to small population numbers. Inbreeding depression occurs when there is a decrease in fitness due to individuals mating with genetic relatives. Typically, this leads to a loss of genetic diversity and a reduction in heterozygosity.

Description
Like the other members of its genus, the medium ground finch is strongly sexually dimorphic; the female's plumage is brown and streaky, while male's is solid black, with white tips to the undertail coverts.  The bird measures  in length—which falls between the lengths of the small and large ground finches. The bill of this species is quite variable in size, though the length of the upper mandible is always greater than the depth of the bill at its base. The wing shape, on average, seems to change with ecological shifts. Different selective pressures act on the wing shape of the finches, such as natural and sexual selection. The males have shorter, rounder wings, which help with maneuvering around a female during sexual displays.

Evolution 
In 1977, a severe drought reduced the supply of seeds in the Galapágos. The finch, which normally preferred small and soft seeds, was forced to turn to harder, larger seeds. This strong selective pressure favoring larger beaks, coupled with the high heritability of traits relating to beak size in finches, caused the medium ground finch population to experience evolution by natural selection, leading to an increase in average beak size in the subsequent generation.

Evidence of evolution through character displacement has been found in a population of medium ground finches on the Galápagos island of Daphne Major. During a drought in 2004, overlap in the diets of the medium ground finch population and a recently settled population of large ground finches (Geospiza magnirostris) led to competition for a limited supply of seeds on which the medium ground finch population normally fed. Because the large ground finches were able to out-compete the medium ground finches for these seeds due to both a larger beak and body size, the medium ground finch population experienced a strong selective pressure against large beaks to avoid competition, ultimately leading to dramatic evolutionary change favoring smaller beaks in the subsequent generation.

Habitat and range
Endemic to the Galápagos, the medium ground finch is found on ten islands: Baltra, Floreana, Isabela, Fernandina, Seymour, Pinzón, San Cristóbal, Santa Cruz, Santa Fé, and Santiago.

Behavior

Feeding
The medium ground finch feeds primarily on seeds, although it is also known to eat flowers, buds, and young leaves, and the occasional insect.  It forages either on the ground or in low vegetation.

Parasites
The medium ground finch has been under parasitism of the fly Philornis downsi as well as the avian pox virus (Poxvirus avium).

Although outbreaks of the virus have been historically rare, in 2008 there was an outbreak that showed to be present in 50% of the finches tested. As a result, the finches have developed antibodies to fight specific invasive parasites. The finches with the highest amount of antibodies tend to have the highest fitness, and therefore produce more viable offspring.

Using a new mathematical model, a 2015 study suggested the population of 270,000 birds on Santa Cruz may become extinct in 50 years. The Philornis flies lay eggs in the nest including in the nestlings nostrils. The larvae feed on living tissue and in worst cases can perforate the bill. Possible solutions include the introduction of parasitic wasps which would lay eggs on the larva, or cotton wool treated with a pesticide which the adult birds would use when constructing the nest.

Notes

References

Sources

External links 
 

Geospiza
Endemic birds of the Galápagos Islands
Birds described in 1837
Taxonomy articles created by Polbot
Taxa named by John Gould